Daniel Roberto Garro (born 25 October 1990) is an Argentine professional footballer who plays as a midfielder.

Career
Garro, after a stint with CAI San Luis, appeared for Juventud Unida Universitario. He made eight appearances and scored once, versus Estudiantes of Río Cuarto, as they finished bottom of their second stage table. In 2012, Garro completed a move to San Luis' Estudiantes in Torneo Argentino C. Within seven months, they won promotion to Torneo Argentino B. He then scored six goals in thirty-three games in tier four, as they won a second successive promotion to Torneo Argentino A. A further two seasons later, in 2014, Garro experienced a third promotion to Primera B Nacional; where he'd score three goals.

On 11 August 2016, Garro joined Primera División side Sarmiento. He made his bow in top-flight football against Arsenal de Sarandí on 26 August, which was one of a total seven matches he participated in during 2016–17; as the club were relegated - though Garro spent the final month of the season on loan in Torneo Federal A with Gimnasia y Esgrima. Garro left on loan again ahead of 2017–18, agreeing terms with Río Cuarto's Estudiantes. He featured in twenty encounters, prior to returning to Sarmiento. He played in four fixtures in the first part of 2018–19, including against ex-club Gimnasia y Esgrima.

July 2019 saw Garro join Deportivo Maipú in Torneo Federal A. He scored two goals in eighteen matches in 2019–20, prior to terminating his contract amidst the COVID-19 pandemic.

Career statistics
.

References

External links

1990 births
Living people
People from San Luis, Argentina
Argentine footballers
Association football midfielders
Torneo Argentino A players
Torneo Argentino B players
Torneo Federal A players
Primera Nacional players
Argentine Primera División players
Juventud Unida Universitario players
Club Sportivo Estudiantes players
Club Atlético Sarmiento footballers
Gimnasia y Esgrima de Mendoza footballers
Estudiantes de Río Cuarto footballers
Deportivo Maipú players